Denis Geoffrey Oswald (12 November 1910 – 5 February 1998) was an English first-class cricketer, educator and a codebreaker at Bletchley Park.

Early life and first-class cricket
Oswald was born at Stanley in the Falkland Islands to Louis and Lillian Oswald. He was educated in England at St Lawrence College, Ramsgate, before going up to Wadham College, Oxford. While studying at Oxford, he made two appearances in first-class cricket for Oxford University in 1931, playing against Leicestershire and the touring New Zealanders at Oxford. In addition to playing first-class cricket, Oswald also played minor counties cricket for Hertfordshire in 1931 and 1932, making a total of nine appearances in the Minor Counties Championship. After graduating from Oxford in 1932, Oswald took up the post of languages teacher at Uppingham School.

Bletchley Park
Oswald served in the Intelligence Corps during the Second World War, initially as a private. He was commissioned as a second lieutenant in June 1941. In Autumn 1942, Oswald, alongside Ralph Tester, Jerry Roberts and Peter Ericsson, founded the Testery section at Bletchley Park.

References

External links

1910 births
1998 deaths
People from Stanley, Falkland Islands
People educated at St Lawrence College, Ramsgate
Alumni of Wadham College, Oxford
Falkland Islands cricketers
English cricketers
Oxford University cricketers
Hertfordshire cricketers
Falkland Islands schoolteachers
Linguists from England
British cryptographers
British Army personnel of World War II
Intelligence Corps officers
Bletchley Park people